Neuwied is a district (Kreis) in the north of Rhineland-Palatinate, Germany. Neighboring districts are (from north clockwise) Rhein-Sieg, Altenkirchen, Westerwaldkreis, Mayen-Koblenz, Ahrweiler.

History
The district was created in 1816 when the area became part of the Prussian Rhine province. In 1822 the district Linz was merged into the district.

The district has a partnership with the Polish county Namysłów in Opole Voivodeship; first contacts date to 1998 and the partnership became official in 2000.

Geography
The districts landscape covers the Westerwald mountains, east of the Rhine river valley. The Rhine forms the western boundary of the district.

Coat of arms
The crosses in the top represent the two clerical states which owned part of the district - the black cross of Cologne in the left, the red cross of Trier in the right. The peacock in the bottom is taken from the coat of arms of the Counts of Wied.

Towns and municipalities

Verband-free town: Neuwied

References

External links
 (German)

 
Districts of Rhineland-Palatinate
1816 establishments in Prussia